Pat Karney is a British Labour Party politician, councillor for Harpurhey in the City of Manchester.  He was born in Dublin and raised in Harpurhey and has been a Labour councillor in the city since 1979.  He is an Associate Executive Member with responsibility for the city centre. He was a Social Services manager for Salford City Council and was Chairman of the City Centre Committee when the IRA bomb devastated the centre.

In 2012 the city centre was said to be "surviving the recession very well." but in 2014 it was said that under his leadership "as the Supremo of Central Manchester, the place has been declining for some time". He has been involved in debate about the Piccadilly Gardens wall for some years. The wall was finally demolished in 2020, shortly after it had been decorated with the slogan "The North is not a Petri dish", and Karney arranged to preserve a section and invited the artist to decorate it again.  He said "It was a big political moment for Manchester and the message symbolises that."

In March 2020 he was accused of bullying John Leech, leader of the Liberal Democrat opposition on the City Council, but was cleared.

References

21st-century British politicians
Labour Party (UK) councillors
Councillors in Manchester
Irish emigrants to the United Kingdom
Living people

1948 births